Ernesto Antonio Claramount Rozeville (1924–2008) was a militant and politician in El Salvador.

Life
Claramount Rozeville was the son of Blanca Rozeville and brigade general Antonio Claramount Lucero (June 13, 1886 - 25 July 1975). A pilot. He attended the Escuela Militar General Gerardo Barrios. In the 1940s, he attended the Cavalry School of Mexican Army. In July 1969, he was in the war against Honduras.

The party alliance National Opposing Union put him on when he was retired colonel to 1977 Salvadoran presidential election as a presidential candidate. As vice president of the former mayor of San Salvador, José Antonio Morales Ehrlich was provided by the Christian Democratic Party.

Salvadoran presidential election, 1977
 Christian Democratic Party
 National Revolutionary Movement
 National Opposing Union

Against the obvious election fraud were protests in the Plaza de Libertad in San Salvador and suppressed the demonstration with about 100 victims.

The government continued Claramount an ultimatum: to be arrested by the military, or leave the country under house arrest. According voluntarily, he was taken with an air force plane to Costa Rica.

Allegedly, Claramount Rozeville was invited in May 1979 in Costa Rica by Constitutionalistas in FAES, placing itself at the top of a coup.

Official voting results
Carlos Humberto Romero (National Coalition Party) received 812,281 votes, which 67% corresponded to
Ernesto Claramount Rozeville (National Opposing Union) received 394,661 votes

The population of El Salvador were about 4.255 million people in the electoral register. 1,206,942 were registered.

In film
In the 1989 film Romero, Claramount Rozeville is played by Juan Pelaez.

Legacy
On 22 December 2008 the creation of a foundation with his name (Fundacion de Coronel Caballeria D.E.M. Ernesto Antonio Claramount Rozeville) was announced. He was buried in the Monte Elena Complejo Funerario cemetery in Antiguo Cuscatlán, La Libertad.

References

1924 births
2008 deaths
Salvadoran politicians
Salvadoran rebels
Salvadoran expatriates in Mexico